Julie Duncanson (born 1968) is a Scottish actress and comedian. She is probably best known for her roles in the soap opera River City as Shona Henderson and sketch comedy show Velvet Soup.

External links

Julie Duncanson on BFI
Julie Duncanson on STV
Julie Duncanson on Spotlight
Julie Duncanson on Twitter

Scottish women comedians
Living people
Scottish television actresses
Year of birth uncertain
1960s births